Aračinovo Municipality is a municipality in the northern part of Republic of North Macedonia. Aračinovo is also the name of the village where the municipal seat is found. The municipality is located in the Skopje Statistical Region.

Geography
Aračinovo Municipality borders with Lipkovo Municipality to the north, the City of Skopje to the west, Petrovec Municipality to the south and Kumanovo Municipality to the east. The municipality is rural, meaning that all the inhabited places within it are villages. The number of the inhabited places in Aračinovo Municipality is 5.

Demographics
The 1994 national census recorded 9,960 inhabitants, while the last national census of 2021 recorded 12,676 inhabitants.

The ethnic structure of the municipality in 2021 was: 12,353 (97.45%) Albanians and 2.55% others.

Inhabited places

There are 4 inhabited places in this municipality.

References

External links
 Official website

 
Municipalities of North Macedonia
Skopje Statistical Region